Assembly elections 1995 was held in Maharashtra, India in two phases on February 12, 1995, and  March 9, 1995. Election results were declared on March 13, 1995. The major parties were Bharatiya Janata Party - Shiv Sena Yuti (alliance) against the Congress.

Results

List of Political Parties participated in 1995 Maharashtra Assembly Elections.

In the election Shiv Sena and Bharatiya Janata Party Alliance or Mahayuti got the majority. Manohar Joshi from Shiv Sena became the 12th  Chief minister of Maharashtra, Thus, forming the first Non-Congress Government in Maharashtra.

The details are as follows:

Summary of results of the Maharashtra State Assembly election, 1995

Chief Ministerial Candidate

Shiv Sena-Bhartiya Janata Party National Democratic Alliance

Indian National Congress

Region-wise Breakup 

Alliance Wise Results:-

The Shiv Sena and BJP won primarily by opposing incumbent chief minister Sharad Pawar's decision to approve a power project of Enron at Dabhol. The $2.8 billion project was being stalled on charges of corruption.

To save the project after the elections, Enron's Rebecca Mark rushed from United States to India. She officially scheduled her meeting with Chief Minister Manohar Joshi at the Secretariat House on 1 November 1995. But before that, she was called to Matoshree to meet Shiv Sena Chief Balasaheb Thackeray. He not only involved himself in the project and key decisions but also decided the appointments of top bureaucrats.

Elected members

References

State Assembly elections in Maharashtra
1990s in Maharashtra
Maharashtra